In the Name of Love is a 1964 studio album by Peggy Lee arranged by Billy May, Dave Grusin, and Lalo Schifrin.  The small group tracks of the album are under the musical direction of pianist Lou Levy.  Released September, 1964, the album spent six weeks in the Billboard charts, and peaked at No. 97.  From this album, Lee's version of the song In The Name Of Love made an appearance in Billboard's "Bubbling Under The Hot 100" chart in the No. 132 position.

Track listing
 "In the Name of Love" (Estelle Levitt, Kenny Rankin) - 2:03
 "My Sin" (Buddy De Sylva, Lew Brown, Ray Henderson) - 2:17
 "The Boy from Ipanema" (Antônio Carlos Jobim, Norman Gimbel, Vinicius De Moraes) – 2:21
 "Shangri-La" (Matty Malneck, Robert Maxwell, Carl Sigman) – 2:30
 "Talk to Me Baby" (Robert E. Dolan, Johnny Mercer) – 2:46
 "There'll Be Some Changes Made" (Benton Overstreet, Billy Higgins) – 2:07
 "After You've Gone" (Turner Layton, Henry Creamer) - 2:24
 "The Right to Love (Reflections)" (Gene Lees, Lalo Schifrin) - 2:54
 "Theme from "Joy House" (Just Call Me Love Bird) (Lalo Schifrin, Peggy Lee) - 2:09
 "Senza Fin" (Alec Wilder, Gino Paoli) - 2:28
 "When in Rome (I Do as the Romans Do)" (Cy Coleman, Carolyn Leigh) - 2:01

Personnel

Recording sessions
In The Name Of Love album sessions, Capitol Tower, 1750 North Vine St., Hollywood, CA

 Peggy Lee – Leader, singer 
 Dave Cavanaugh - Producer

Arrangers
Lou Levy (Head arrangements) – After You've Gone, My Sin, In The Name Of Love, There'll Be Some Changes Made, Senza Fine
Dave Grusin –  When In Rome, Shangri-La, Talk To Me Baby
Billy May – The Boy From Ipanema 
Lalo Schifrin – The Right To Love (Reflections), Just Call Me Love Bird

June 26, 1964
titles recorded: After You've Gone, My Sin, In The Name Of Love

 Joe Polio – Engineer
 Bob Bain, John Pisano, Howard Roberts – Guitar 
 Chuck Berghofer – Bass 
 Lou Levy – Piano, arranger, leader 
 Stan Levey – Drums 
 Francisco Aguabella – Bongos, congas

July 1, 1964
titles recorded: Talk To Me, Baby, When In Rome (I Do As The Romans Do), The Girl From Ipanema

 Hugh Davies – Engineer 
 Billy May - Conductor, arranger 
  Justin Gordon, Paul Horn, Ted Nash, Maury Stein – Saxophones, woodwinds
 Conrad Gozzo, Mannie Klein, Ray Triscari – Trumpets 
  Milt Bernhart, Ed Kusby, Kenny Shroyer – Trombones
 Jim Decker – French Horn  
 John Pisano – Guitar  
 Chuck Berghofer – Bass  
 Lou Levy – Piano  
 Stan Levey – Drums  
 Francisco Aguabella – Bongos/Congas

July 2, 1964
titles recorded: Shangri-La, The Right To Love (Reflections)

 Hugh Davies – Engineer  
  Jules Jacob – Woodwinds/recorder  
 Justin Gordon, Paul Horn –  Woodwinds   
 Milt Bernhart, Ed Kusby – Trombones  
 Jim Decker – French Horn    
 John Pisano – Guitar  
 Chuck Berghofer – Bass  
 Lou Levy – Piano  
 Stan Levey – Drums  
 Francisco Aguabella – Bongos/Congas

July 6, 1964
titles recorded: There'll Be Some Changes Made, Just Call Me Love Bird, Senza Fine

 Joe Polio – Engineer
  Justin Gordon, Paul Horn – Saxophones, woodwinds
 Bob Bain, John Pisano, Howard Roberts – Guitar   
 Chuck Berghofer – Bass  
 Lou Levy – Piano  
 Stan Levey – Drums  
 Francisco Aguabella – Bongos/Congas

References

1964 albums
Capitol Records albums
Peggy Lee albums
Albums produced by Dave Cavanaugh